Mount Taylor is a census-designated place (CDP) in Cibola County, New Mexico, United States. It was first listed as a CDP prior to the 2020 census.

The community is in northern Cibola County and is bordered to the north and west by Grants, the county seat, and to the south by the Rio San Jose and a tributary. New Mexico State Road 117, the local name of Historic Route 66, passes through the community.

Demographics

References 

Census-designated places in Cibola County, New Mexico
Census-designated places in New Mexico